Christos Vrettos (25 March 1894 – October 1973) was a Greek athlete. He competed in the men's shot put at the 1924 Summer Olympics.

References

External links
 

1894 births
1973 deaths
Athletes (track and field) at the 1924 Summer Olympics
Greek male shot putters
Olympic athletes of Greece
Place of birth missing
Sportspeople from Nafplion